Teejay Marquez is a Filipino actor, dancer, television personality and commercial model who was recently seen in GMA Network's shows. As of 2015 he is under ABS-CBN management. He also works as an actor in Indonesia.

Filmography

Film

Television

Awards
 2011 PMPC Star Awards for Television's "Best Male New TV Personality" for Tween Hearts 2009 (tied with his co-star/nominee Derrick Monasterio).

References

External links

Biodata Teejay Marquez

Living people
Filipino male child actors
Filipino male television actors
Male actors from Manila
People from Quezon City
1993 births
Filipino expatriates in Indonesia
GMA Network personalities